In Town is a musical comedy written by Adrian Ross and James T. Tanner, with music by F. Osmond Carr and lyrics by Ross.  The plot of In Town, though thin, is a smart tale of backstage and society intrigue.  One of the popular songs from the show was "The Man About Town".

The piece was first produced by George Edwardes and debuted with success in 1892, playing in New York in 1897.  It was one of the first Edwardian musical comedies, lighter than a Gilbert and Sullivan-style comic opera, but more coherent in construction than a Victorian burlesque.  The piece initiated Edwardes's famous series of modern-dress musical shows at the Gaiety Theatre that led ladies' clothing fashions throughout Britain.  After In Town, the Edwardian musical comedies dominated the musical stage in Britain until the 1920s.

History
In Town was first produced by George Edwardes at the Prince of Wales Theatre, opening on 15 October 1892, and transferred to the Gaiety Theatre on 26 December 1892, running for a successful 292 performances.  It starred Arthur Roberts, together with Edmund Payne, Eric Lewis, and singing star Florence St John.  Topsy Sinden danced in the piece. The musical was produced on Broadway, for a run of 40 performances, opening on 6 September 1897 at the Knickerbocker Theatre, starring W. Louis Bradfield as Arthur Coddington and Marie Studholme as Kitty.

In Town was one of the first Edwardian musical comedies on the London stage.  It was lighter than a Gilbert and Sullivan style comic opera, but more coherent in construction than a burlesque.  The piece initiated Tanner's and Edwardes's famous series of modern-dress musical shows and helped set the new fashion for the series of Gaiety Theatre musical hits that followed.   Many of the best-known London couturiers began to design costumes for stage productions by the 1880s.  The illustrated periodicals were eager to publish photographs of the actresses in the latest stage hits, and so the theatre became an excellent way for clothiers to publicise their latest fashions.

After In Town, the Edwardian musical comedies would dominate the musical stage in Britain, and contribute to musical theatre throughout the English-speaking world and beyond, until the 1920s.

Synopsis
Captain Coddington, a penniless lad-about-town, gives a young aristocrat friend, Lord Clanside, a tour of the slightly naughty lifestyles both high and low, to be found in London.  Coddington invites all the ladies of the Ambiguity Theatre to lunch; Clanside agrees to pay the bill if he is invited to the party.  Afterwards, with several uninvited guests, they visit the theatre to see a rehearsal.  Coddington romances the prima donna of the theatre and wins her.

Roles and original cast
The original cast was as follows: 
Captain Arthur Coddington – Arthur Roberts
The Duke of Duffshire  – Eric Lewis
Lord Clanside –  Phyllis Broughton
The Rev. Samuel Hopkins  – E. Bantock
Benoll –  H. Grattan
Shrimp –  Jessie Rogers
Duchess of Duffshire –  Maria Davis
Flo Fanshawe  –  Sylvia Gray
Kitty Hetherton  – Florence St. John

References

External links
Information about shows that opened in London in 1892

In Town (musical)
West End musicals
Original musicals
British musicals